Franco Gorzelewski (born 6 June 1996) is an Argentine professional footballer who plays as a centre-back for Brindisi Calcio.

Career
Gorzelewski started his career with Huracán. While featuring for their academy teams, the defender spent time out on loan in Italy with Lega Pro's Padova; though didn't appear competitively for the club. In 2016, Gorzelewski joined Tercera División side Alcobendas Sport. Twelve appearances followed in the fourth tier of Spanish football. January 2017 saw Gorzelewski depart Huracán permanently, subsequently signing for Paganese of the Italian Lega Pro. He was an unused sub twelve times in 2016–17, before making his debut in their season finale against Reggina on 7 May. A stint with Palazzolo came in 2018.

In July 2018, Gorzelewski returned to Argentina after agreeing a move to Primera B Nacional's Santamarina. His professional bow arrived on 1 September during a 0–0 draw at home to Arsenal de Sarandí. In September 2019, Gorzelewski moved to Italy again and joined Serie D club US Levico Terme. He made nineteen appearances as they suffered relegation; a fate he had previously experienced with Palazzolo. Gorzelewski, however, remained in Serie D after penning terms with Lanusei Calcio.

In January 2021, Gorzelewski  moved to SSD Insieme Formia. On 2 August 2021, he joined US Città di Fasano.

Personal life
Gorzelewski was born in Buenos Aires, Argentina to a Polish father and an Italian mother, who was born in Calabria, Italy.

Career statistics
.

References

External links

1996 births
Living people
Footballers from Buenos Aires
Argentine people of Polish descent
Argentine people of Italian descent
Argentine footballers
Association football defenders
Argentine expatriate footballers
Expatriate footballers in Spain
Expatriate footballers in Italy
Argentine expatriate sportspeople in Spain
Argentine expatriate sportspeople in Italy
Tercera División players
Serie C players
Serie D players
Primera Nacional players
Club Atlético Huracán footballers
CD Paracuellos Antamira players
Paganese Calcio 1926 players
Club y Biblioteca Ramón Santamarina footballers
A.S.D. S.C. Palazzolo players